Johan Olaus Søhr MVO (né Sørensen; 6 September 1867 – 1 January 1949) was a Norwegian jurist and police officer. Commonly known as Joh. Søhr.

Personal life
Søhr was born in Oterøy, Sannidal, as the son of farmer and ship owner Johan Christian Sørensen and Ellen Kathrine Sørensen. He was married to Margit Mosgaard. In 1914 he changed his name from Sørensen to Søhr. He died in Bærum in 1949.

Career
Søhr finished his secondary education in Kristiania in 1885. He  studied at the Norwegian Military Academy, and then Law at the University of Kristiania, graduating as cand.jur. in 1890. His first assignments were in Søndre Bergenhus and in Østerdalen. He started working for the Kristiania Police in 1896, and as police inspector from 1906 to 1913. He was chief of the criminal department of the Kristiania Police from 1913 to 1925. During World War I he was responsible for the investigation of several espionage cases. Among these were the Otto von Rosen case, which involved confiscation of explosives, bottles with the toxin curare, and anthrax bacteria, and the Rautenfels case, when 188 kg of explosives were confiscated at the railway station Oslo Ø.

From 1925 to 1937 Søhr was Chief of Police of Aker. In 1938 he published the book Spioner og bomber. Fra opdagelsespolitiets arbeide under verdenskrigen, an account of the espionage cases during World War I. He was decorated Knight, First Class of the Royal Norwegian Order of St. Olav in 1917, and was also Knight of the Swedish Order of the Polar Star. He was decorated Knight of the French Légion d'honneur, Officer of the Dutch Order of Orange-Nassau, and received the Order of the British Empire and the Royal Victorian Order.

Bibliography

References

1867 births
1949 deaths
People from Kragerø
Norwegian Military Academy alumni
University of Oslo alumni
Norwegian police chiefs
Norwegian non-fiction writers
Espionage writers
Norwegian memoirists
Knights of the Order of the Polar Star
Chevaliers of the Légion d'honneur
Honorary Members of the Order of the British Empire
Honorary Members of the Royal Victorian Order
Officers of the Order of Orange-Nassau